Alec Wales (4 December 1916 – 1975) was a British gymnast. He competed in eight events at the 1948 Summer Olympics.

References

1916 births
1975 deaths
British male artistic gymnasts
Olympic gymnasts of Great Britain
Gymnasts at the 1948 Summer Olympics
Place of birth missing